Irene Lekapene (born Maria; , , died ca. 966) was the Empress consort of Peter I of Bulgaria. She was а daughter of Christopher Lekapenos, son and co-emperor of Romanos I Lekapenos, and his wife Augusta Sophia.

To prove himself a worthy successor to his father both at home and in the eyes of foreign governments, Bulgaria's new emperor Peter I made a show of force by invading Byzantine Thrace in May 927, but showed himself ready to negotiate for a more permanent peace. Romanos seized the occasion and proposed a marriage alliance between the imperial houses of Byzantium and Bulgaria to end the War of 913–927. Romanos arranged for a diplomatic marriage between his granddaughter Maria and the Bulgarian monarch. For the first time in Byzantine history, a Byzantine princess was to be married to a foreign ruler; decades later, Romanos' son-in-law and co-ruler Constantine VII criticized Romanos for this concession. In October 927 Peter arrived near Constantinople to meet Romanos and signed the peace treaty, marrying Maria on November 8. To signify the new era in Bulgaro-Byzantine relations, Maria was renamed Irene ("peace").

Irene and Peter I of Bulgaria had several children, including:
 Plenimir
 Boris II, who succeeded as emperor of Bulgaria in 969
 Roman, who succeeded as emperor of Bulgaria in 977

References

Bulgarian consorts
Irene
10th-century births
10th-century deaths
10th-century Byzantine people
10th-century Bulgarian people
Daughters of Byzantine emperors
10th-century Byzantine women
10th-century Bulgarian women